William Perceval, D.D. was an Irish priest in the first decades of the 18th century.
 
The nephew of Sir John Perceval, 1st Baronet, he was educated at Christ Church, Oxford and Trinity College Dublin. He was Archdeacon of Cashel from 1703 until 1725; and Dean of Emly from 1714 until 1735.  He also became a Prebendary of Christ Church Cathedral, Dublin in 1720. He married (1708) Catherine, daughter of Henry Prittie of Killboy and Dunalley.

References

Deans of Emly
Archdeacons of Cashel
Alumni of Christ Church, Oxford
Alumni of Trinity College Dublin
18th-century Irish Anglican priests